The 2022 Copa do Brasil (officially the Copa Intelbras do Brasil 2022 for sponsorship reasons) was the 34th edition of the Copa do Brasil football competition. It was held between 22 February and 19 October 2022.

The competition was contested by 92 teams, either qualified by participating in their respective state championships (70), by the 2022 CBF ranking (10), by the 2021 Copa do Nordeste (1), by the 2021 Copa Verde (1), by the 2021 Série B (1) or those qualified for 2022 Copa Libertadores (9). Atlético Mineiro were the defending champions but they were eliminated in the Round of 16.

Tied 1–1 on aggregate, Flamengo defeated Corinthians 6–5 on penalties in the finals to win their fourth title. As champions, Flamengo qualified for the 2023 Copa Libertadores group stage and 2023 Supercopa do Brasil.

Giorgian de Arrascaeta (Flamengo) and Cássio (Corinthians) won best player and best goalkeeper awards, respectively.

Qualified teams
Teams in bold were qualified directly for the third round.

Format
The competition is a single-elimination tournament, the first two rounds are played as a single match and the rest are played as a two-legged ties. Twelve teams enter in the third round, which are teams qualified for 2022 Copa Libertadores (9), Série B champions, Copa Verde champions and Copa do Nordeste champions. The remaining 80 teams play in the first round, the 40 winners play the second round, and the 20 winners play the third round. Finally, the sixteen third round winners advance to the round of 16.

Schedule
The schedule of the competition was as follows:

Draw

First round

Second round

Third round

Final rounds

Bracket

Round of 16

Quarter-finals

Semi-finals

Finals

Top goalscorers

References

2022
2022 in Brazilian football